"Green Leaves", also known as the Koontz House or the Beltzhoover House, is a Greek Revival mansion in Natchez, Mississippi, completed in 1838 by Edward P. Fourniquet, a French lawyer who built other structures in the area. It was purchased by George Washington Koontz, a local banker in 1849 and has been owned by his descendants ever since. It was listed on the National Register of Historic Places (NRHP) in 1979.

Description
The house is best recognized for its preserved family memorabilia and furnishings. The NRHP listing documentation notes that although it is "a somewhat static setting" externally, "the interior design of the house is notable for both its excellence and integrity". It includes not merely many period architectural features but also period decoration and contents, which together make it "one of the most valuable national documents of mid-nineteenth century taste". It is one of several historic buildings in Natchez which adopted the Greek Revival style and which maintain significant historic interiors.

The house is also well known for its gardens, which contain a wide variety of plants, including several camellias and azaleas. The entire back yard is shaded by a massive live oak tree, estimated to be well over 400 years old. The Natchez Indians are believed by some to have used the tree as a gathering place. The front contains a smaller live oak, estimated to be over 200 years old, and a large magnolia tree, reportedly one of the largest in the state.

History
The original house, now the north wing, was built around 1812 for Jonathan Thompson, a wealthy cotton farmer in the area.  This house was two stories and framed entirely of brick, and was later used as an adjacent kitchen and servant and slave quarters. Thompson and his family were killed by yellow fever in May 1820.  The land was purchased in 1836 by Edward P. Fourniquet, a French-born lawyer who built other structures in the area. In late 1838, he completed what is now the main section of the house, adjacent to the original, for a price of about $25,000. This section contains the Greek Revival architecture, and is the section that the house became known for. 
 
The house was purchased by George Washington Koontz, a banker, in 1849. Koontz moved into the area from Pennsylvania in 1836 and joined in business partnership with William Audley Britton that same year. Their bank, named Britton & Koontz Bank, was in existence until February 2014, when it merged with Home Bancorp, Inc., a Lafayette, Louisiana banking company. The Koontzes added a south bedroom wing in the 1850s and connected the main section and the original building in the 1880s and 1890s.

The house was listed on the National Register of Historic Places (NRHP) on March 29, 1979.

See also
 Auburn (Natchez, Mississippi)
 Melrose (Natchez, Mississippi)
 Monmouth (Natchez, Mississippi)

References

Further reading

Houses on the National Register of Historic Places in Mississippi
Houses in Natchez, Mississippi
National Register of Historic Places in Natchez, Mississippi
Individually listed contributing properties to historic districts on the National Register in Mississippi
Houses completed in 1838
Slave cabins and quarters in the United States